= Royal Mail (play) =

- Written by: Alexander Turner
- Original language: England
- Genre: drama

Royal Mail is a 1939 Australian stage play by Alexander Turner.

It won Best Play at the 1939 Drama Festival in Perth. It was recommended for production by the Playwrights' Advisory Board.

The play was published in a collection of Turner's plays in 1945.

Leslie Rees called it "only a half success" describing the play as a "series of tableaux of life in a Murchison gold-mining centre—a small world that is keenly observed and full of touches of humour of character and scene. There is utterly nothing derived here, but the play as a whole flounders because of insufficient energy of purpose and constructive design. It would seem that Turner is at home in the single situations appropriate to his (mostly) simple people, and so The Golden Journey, an atmospheric stage one-acter set on an inland railway station leading to the fields, really says just as much as does Royal Mail and is far more concise."
